Gun Grit is a 1936 American western film directed by William Berke and starring Jack Perrin, David Sharpe and Roger Williams. It was produced on Poverty Row as a second feature. The film is also known by the alternative title of Protection Racket in the United Kingdom.

Synopsis
Gangsters from the big city attempt to expand their empire by establishing a protection racket amongst cattle ranchers but are battled by Federal agent Bob Blake.

Cast
Jack Perrin as Bob Blake
Ethel Beck as Jean Hess
David Sharpe as Dave Hess
Roger Williams as Mack (Gang Boss)
Ralph Peters as Henchman Dopey
Frank Hagney as Henry Hess - an FBI Chief
Jimmy Aubrey as The Janitor
Ed Cassidy as Tim Hess (Rancher)
Phil Dunham as Henchman Looie
Oscar Gahan as Henchman Don
Earl Dwire as Uncle Joe Hess
Horace Murphy as Rancher Sully
Lester William Berke as Bobby Hess
 Budd Buster as 	Henchman 
 Olin Francis as Murray 
 Herman Hack as Federal Agent
Braveheart as Hess' dog
Starlight the Horse as Starlight, Bob's horse

References

Bibliography
 Pitts, Michael R. Poverty Row Studios, 1929–1940. McFarland & Company, 2005.

External links

1936 films
American Western (genre) films
American black-and-white films
1936 Western (genre) films
Films directed by William A. Berke
1930s English-language films
1930s American films